Augustin Parent (Villelongue-de-la-Salanque, 30 July 1935-Avignon, 13 April 2002), was a French rugby league player. He played as a second-row.

He played for Avignon, with which he won the Lord Derby Cup in 1955 and 1956. In 1957, Avignon was in the French Championship final, however, Parent was called for the military service, joining the Joinville Battalion. Thanks to his club performances, he represented France 9 times between 1956 and 1957, taking part at the 1957 Rugby League World Cup.

Biography 
He was called up for the France national team to play the 1957 Rugby League World Cup alongside his teammates René Jean, Jacques Merquey and Jean Rouqueirol.

Honours

Rugby league 

 Team honours :
 Lord Derby Cup : Champion in 1955 and 1956 (Avignon),.

References

External links 

  Augustin Parent profile at rugbyleagueproject.com

French rugby league players
1935 births
Sportspeople from Pyrénées-Orientales
Rugby league second-rows
2002 deaths
Sporting Olympique Avignon players
France national rugby league team players